The Caretakers' Union (KL or KTTL) was a trade union representing janitors in Finland.

The union was founded in 1948 and affiliated to the Finnish Federation of Trade Unions, and from 1969, to its successor, the Central Organisation of Finnish Trade Unions. It had only 2,228 members in 1955, but by 1998, this had grown to 13,881. In 2000, it merged with the Business Union, the Technical and Special Trades Union, and the Hotel and Restaurant Workers' Union, to form the Service Union United.

References

Trade unions established in 1948
Trade unions disestablished in 2000
Trade unions in Finland
1948 establishments in Finland
2000 disestablishments in Finland